Cassinia trinerva is a species of flowering plant in the family Asteraceae and is endemic to south-eastern Australia. It is an erect shrub or small tree with hairy stems, narrow lance-shaped leaves, and flower heads arranged in dense corymbs.

Description
The upper surface of the leaves is slightly sticky and the lower surface is cottony-hairy. The heads are crowded in dense corymbs  in diameter.

Taxonomy and naming
Cassinia trinerva was first formally described in 1951 by Norman Arthur Wakefield in The Victorian Naturalist.

Distribution
This cassinia is an understorey shrub in tall forests, on the edge of rainforest and on dry rocky sites. It occurs in south-eastern Queensland, on the coast and tablelands of New South Wales south from Bolivia, in south-eastern Victoria and north-eastern Tasmania.

References

trinerva
Asterales of Australia
Flora of New South Wales
Flora of Queensland
Flora of Victoria (Australia)
Flora of Tasmania
Plants described in 1951